An election to Neath Port Talbot County Borough Council was held on 5 May 2022 as part of wider local elections across Wales. The election was preceded by the 2017 election. Three candidates (from the sixty seats available) were elected unopposed.

Ward results
Nominations closed on 4 April 2022.

The following results were announced following the elections. In the case of wards electing more than one councillor the percentage figures reflect the number of ballot papers issues rather than the total number of votes.

Aberavon (two seats)

Aberdulais (one seat)

Alltwen (one seat)

Baglan (three seats)

Blaengwrach and Glynneath West (one seat)

Briton Ferry East (one seat)
Chris James was elected as a Labour candidate in 2017.

Briton Ferry West (one seat)

Bryn and Cwmavon (three seats)

Bryncoch North (one seat)

Bryncoch South (two seats)

Cadoxton (one seat)

Cimla and Pelenna (two seats)

Coedffranc Central (two seats)

Coedffranc North (one seat)

Coedffranc West (two seats)

Crynant, Onllwyn and Seven Sisters (two seats)

Cwmllynfell and Ystalyfera (two seats)

Cymmer and Glyncorrwg (one seat)

Dyffryn (two seats)

Glynneath Central and East (one seat)

Godre'r Graig (one seat)

Gwaun Cae Gurwen and Lower Brynaman (two seats)

Gwynfi and Croeserw (one seat)
Scott Jones was elected as a Labour candidate in 2017.

Margam and Taibach (three seats)

Jones was the former councillor for the Margam ward, which was merged with Tai-bach in 2022. Keogh was formerly the councillor for Port Talbot

Neath East (three seats)

Neath North (two seats)

Neath South (two seats)

Pontardawe (two seats)

Port Talbot (two seats)

Due to the death of a candidate, the Port Talbot ward election was postponed until 23 June 2022.

Resolven and Tonna (two seats)

Rhos (one seat)

Sandfields East (three seats)

Sandfields West (three seats)

Trebanos (one seat)

Aftermath
The Independent Group and Plaid Cymru agreed a deal to take control of the council, ending 26 years of Labour dominance.

References

Neath Port Talbot County Borough Council elections
Neath